Anuradhapura ( anūrādhapūra distrikkaya;  Aṉurātapuram māvaṭṭam) is a district in North Central Province, Sri Lanka. Its area is 7,179 km².

Major cities
 Anuradhapura (Municipal Council)

Other towns

 Bulnewa
 Eppawala
 Galenbindunuwewa
 Galnewa
 Ganewalpola
 Habarana
 Horowupotana
 Kahatagasdigiliya
 Kebitigollawa
 Kekirawa
 Konapathirawa
 Konwewa
 Madatugama
 Mahailuppallama
 Maradankadawala
 Medawachchiya
 Mihintale
 Nochchiyagama
 Nachchaduwa
 Padawiya
 Palugaswewa
 Rambewa
 Seeppukulama
 Talawa
 Tambuttegama
 Thirappane
 Yakalla

Anuradhapura district election divisions
 Anuradhapura East Electoral District
 Anuradhapura West Electoral District
 Horowpothana Electoral District
 Kalawewa Electoral District
 Kekirawa Electoral District
 Medawachchiya Electoral District
 Mihintale Electoral District

Demographics

The population according to the 2001 census is 745,693, of whom 90.7% were Sinhalese, 8.3% Sri Lankan Moors,  0.7% native Sri Lankan Tamils and 0.1% Tamils of Indian origin. 90.0% of the population are Buddhists, 8.4% Muslim, 1.1% Christian and 0.5% Hindu.

Divisional secretariats

Divisional secretariats constitute the next administrative division down from district.

 Anuradapura Divisional Secretariat
 Galenbindunuwewa Divisional Secretariat
 Galnewa Divisional Secretariat
 Horowpothana Divisional Secretariat
 Ipalogama Divisional Secretariat
 Kahatagasdigiliya Divisional Secretariat
 Kebithigollewa Divisional Secretariat
 Kekirawa Divisional Secretariat
 Mahavilachchiya Divisional Secretariat
 Medawachchiya Divisional Secretariat
 Mihinthale Divisional Secretariat
 Nachchadoowa Divisional Secretariat
 Nochchiyagama Divisional Secretariat
 Nuwaragam Palatha Central Divisional Secretariat
 Nuwaragam Palatha East Divisional Secretariat
 Padaviya Divisional Secretariat
 Palagala Divisional Secretariat
 Palugaswewa Divisional Secretariat
 Rajanganaya Divisional Secretariat
 Rambewa Divisional Secretariat
 Thalawa Divisional Secretariat
 Thambuttegama Divisional Secretariat
 Thirappane Divisional Secretariat

Maps
Detailed map of Anuradhapura District and Sri Lanka

References 

 
Districts of Sri Lanka